Allan William "Dick" Pollard (25 June 1913 – 10 November 1966) was an Australian rules footballer who played with Footscray in the Victorian Football League (VFL).

Family
The son of Joseph William Pollard (1871–1940) and Alice Sophia Pollard (1877–1947), née Jones, Allan William Pollard was born at Korumburra, Victoria, on 25 June 1913.

He married Heather May Jones (1910–1998) in Leongatha, in 1941.

Football
Cleared from Maffra to Footscray in May 1934.

Cricket
He was also a well-performed cricketer.

Military service
Pollard later served in the Australian Army during World War II.

Death
He died at the Repatriation General Hospital, in Heidelberg, Victoria, on 10 November 1966.

Notes

References
 
 World War II Service Record: Lance Corporal Allan William Pollard (VX106716), National Archives of Australia.

External links 
 
 

1913 births
1966 deaths
Australian rules footballers from Victoria (Australia)
Western Bulldogs players
Australian Army personnel of World War II
Australian Army soldiers